Silo Theatre is a theatre production company based in Auckland, and was established in 1997.

Background 
Silo Theatre started out as a 'boutique underground theatre' in a venue off Queen Street in central Auckland in 1997. Silo moved out in 2007 and this venue is now the home of The Basement Theatre.

Shane Boscher was director from 2001 - 2013, while he was there he also directed over 12 productions. Some of the works programmed in this time include playwrights Neil Labute, Caryl Churchill, Patrick Marber, Bertolt Brecht, Samuel Beckett, and New Zealand authors Toa Fraser, Jodie Molloy and Jackie Van Beek. Whilst at Silo, Boscher was an 'Aucklander of 2005' and in 2007 included in the 'Most Influential People Under 40' list both by Auckland based Metro magazine. Sophie Roberts was appointed artistic director in 2014 and is still in the role in 2022.  

Staff have included Jessica Smith (Executive Director) and Ahi Karunaharan (Associate Artistic Director).  

Silo Theatre produces an annual season of local and international work their work is presented in venues and spaces across Auckland, New Zealand and sometimes overseas. Their purpose is stated to: 

 Encourage the pursuit of excellence in Aotearoa New Zealand’s arts practitioners and stage craft
 Foster greater inclusion and representation in storytelling and invigorate diverse audiences
 Contribute to, and develop, the arts and the culture landscape of Tāmaki Makaurau and Aotearoa

Programming 
Some of the notable productions produced by Silo Theatre include Bare by Toa Fraser (1998) and Wild Dogs Under My Skirt by Tusiata Avia (2019), a co-production by Auckland Arts Festival. In 2021 part of their programme for Matariki was a participatory audio play, Mauri Tau, written and directed by Scotty Cotter featuring Nicola Kāwana, Rachel House, Tanea Heke and Te Kohe Tuhaka. This production came as a result of COVID 19 effects on creating live stage productions. Cotter collaborated with sound designers Fran Kora, Matt Eller, and Komako Silver for this streamed event.

In 2015 Silo produced Hudson & Halls! a play about New Zealand TV cooks and personalities Peter Hudson and David Halls. It premiered at the Herald Theatre, Auckland and was directed by Kip Chapman starring Todd Emerson, Chris Parker and Jackie van Beek.

Every Brilliant Thing by Duncan Macmillan with Jonny Donahoe was a solo play in 2020 about suicide and mental health that had two leads that alternated each night, Jason Te Kare and Anapela Polata’ivao. 

Words from Pacific Island poets was curated into a Silo production called UPU, created by Grace Iwashita-Taylor and directed by Fasitua Amosa. It premiered at the Auckland Arts Festival and then was presented at the Kia Mau Festival in Wellington in 2021.

Other events that Silo host include talks such as the one off Once in a Black Moon in 2022 created in partnership with Black Creatives Aotearoa with panelists Adorate Mizero, Keagan Carr Fransch, Michelle Mascoll Michelle Mascoll and Vira Paky. This was to accompany the play seven methods of killing kylie jenner by of Jasmine Lee Jones at the Basement Theatre.

Development series 
Silo has new work development series called Working Titles. In 2017 this included Modern Girls in Bed by Alex Lodge and Cherie Jacobson, The Defendant (by Dan Musgrove) and Burn Her by Sam Brooks.

References 

1997 establishments in New Zealand
Arts organizations established in 1997
Theatre companies in New Zealand